List of Azerbaijani Heroes of the Soviet Union lists all ethnic Azerbaijani Heroes of the Soviet Union, along with their unit and rank at time of action, and the date of the award. The title Hero of the Soviet Union was the highest distinction of the Soviet Union. 42 Azerbaijanis were awarded the title, including three whose ethnicity is disputed. All Azerbaiajni Heroes of the Soviet Union received their award for actions in World War II. Hazi Aslanov was the only Azerbaijani to receive the title twice.

Recipients

Military Personnel

Partisans

See also 

Azerbaijan in World War II

References 

Heroes of the Soviet Union lists